Ben Yagan (born 9 February 1995) is a Belgian-Armenian football player who plays as a forward and is currently playing for S.C. Eendracht Aalst in the Belgian Division 2.

Club career
Yagan grew up as a youth in K. Diegem Sport. In Brussels, he was at the age of 16 when he transferred to the Oud-Heverlee Leuven youth team. Yagan was promoted from the youth squad of Oud-Heverlee Leuven to the first team at the beginning of the 2012-13 season and was allowed to play for the first time on 25 November 2012, when he was subbed on in injury time for Günther Vanaudenaerde in a 1-1 draw away to Genk.

Following the 2014-15 season, the contract of Yagan with OH Leuven ended and he was released. Near the end of October 2015, he signed as a free player for Heist.

Personal
Yagan's older brother Ivan Yagan also plays professional football.

References

External links

1995 births
Living people
Footballers from Brussels
Belgian footballers
Ethnic Armenian sportspeople
Oud-Heverlee Leuven players
K.S.K. Heist players
K.F.C. Dessel Sport players
K.S.V. Roeselare players
K. Patro Eisden Maasmechelen players
K.V.K. Tienen-Hageland players
Belgian Pro League players
Challenger Pro League players
Belgian people of Armenian descent

Association football forwards
K. Diegem Sport players